Styletta is a genus of flies in the family Phoridae.

Species
S. camponoti Brown, 1988
S. crocea Borgmeier, 1960
S. ewardurskae Disney, 1990

References

Phoridae
Platypezoidea genera